Carl Jacob Burckhardt (September 10, 1891 – March 3, 1974) was a Swiss diplomat and historian. His career alternated between periods of academic historical research and diplomatic postings; the most prominent of the latter were League of Nations High Commissioner for the Free City of Danzig (1937–39) and President of the International Committee of the Red Cross (1945–48).

Biography

Burckhardt was born in Basel to Carl Christoph Burckhardt, a member of the patrician Burckhardt family, and attended gymnasium in Basel and Glarisegg (in Steckborn). He subsequently studied at the universities of Basel, Zürich, Munich, and Göttingen, being particularly influenced by professors Ernst Gagliardi and Heinrich Wölfflin.

He gained his first diplomatic experience in the Swiss legation in Austria from 1918 to 1922, a chaotic period following the collapse of Austria-Hungary. While there, he became acquainted with Hugo von Hofmannsthal. Burckhardt earned his doctorate in 1922, and then accepted an appointment with the International Committee of the Red Cross (ICRC), which posted him to Asia Minor, where he assisted in the resettlement of Greeks expelled from Turkey following Greece's 1922 defeat.

He subsequently returned to Switzerland to pursue an academic career,. In 1926, he married Marie-Elisabeth de Reynold (1906-1989) a daughter of Swiss writer, historian, and right-wing political activist Gonzague de Reynold (1880-1970). One year later, he was appointed Privatdozent at the University of Zurich and in 1929 extraordinary professor of contemporary history. From 1932 to 1937 he was ordinary professor at the recently created Graduate Institute of International Studies in Geneva. While there, he published in 1935 the first volume of his comprehensive biography of Cardinal Richelieu, which would eventually be completed by the publication of the 4th volume in 1967.
He returned to a diplomatic career in 1937, serving as the final League of Nations High Commissioner for the Free City of Danzig from 1937 to 1939. In that position, he aimed to maintain the international status of Danzig guaranteed by the League of Nations, which brought him into contact with a number of prominent Nazis as he attempted to stave off increasing German demands. The mission eventually ended unsuccessfully with the invasion of Poland in September 1939. Burckhardt was placed under house arrest by the Nazi Gauleiter for Danzig Albert Forster, and given two hours leave the city. Burckhardt then fled to Lithuania, and Nazi Germany would subsequently annex Danzig. Following this period as High Commissioner, he returned to his professorship in Geneva for the rest of World War II (1939–1945). While in that position, he was also active in a leading role in the ICRC, traveling to Germany several times to negotiate for better treatment of civilians and prisoners, in part using the contacts gained during his two years as High Commissioner in Danzig.

Involvement with Nazism
After the war, he became President of the ICRC, serving from 1945 to 1948. Organizationally, he increased the integration of the international Red Cross institutions and the national Red Cross Societies. Politically, his term was controversial as he maintained the ICRC's existing policy of strict neutrality in international disputes, which led to the ICRC refusing to condemn the Nazis as their atrocities came to light officially. His strong anticommunism even led him to considering Nazism the lesser evil. He meanwhile simultaneously served from 1945 to 1949 as the Swiss envoy in Paris. He opposed the Nuremberg trials, calling them “Jewish revenge.” Under his watch, the ICRC provided documents that helped many high-level Nazis, including Adolf Eichmann and Josef Mengele, escape Europe and evade justice for their war crimes in World War II.The Red Cross' stance during the war did not fully come to light until it opened its archives from the period in 1994.

After 1949, he returned to his academic career, publishing a number of books on history over the next several decades. In 1954, he was awarded the Peace Prize of the German Book Trade. He died in 1974 in Vinzel. The slab of his grave at the cemetery of Vinzel bears an inscription:"BENEDICTUS BENEDICAT" (“May the Blessed One give a blessing”)The Christian message is commonly used as an opening grace of thanksgiving before a meal. However, the grave slab incorrectly attributes it to the Epistle to the Hebrews (2,1).

Works
 Der Berner Schultheiss Charles Neuhaus (1925)
 Richelieu (4 vols., 1935–67)
 Gestalten und Mächte (1941)
 Reden und Aufzeichnungen (1952)
 Meine Danziger Mission, 1937–1939 (1960)
 GW (6 vols., 1971)
 Memorabilien (1977)
 Briefe: 1908–1974 (1986)

References

Sources

External links 
 
 
 

1891 births
1974 deaths
Carl Jakob
20th-century Swiss historians
Swiss male writers
Swiss diplomats
Swiss Protestants
Red Cross personnel
League of Nations people
Swiss anti-communists
Academic staff of the Graduate Institute of International and Development Studies
Recipients of the Pour le Mérite (civil class)
Ambassadors of Switzerland to France
Writers from Basel-Stadt